Ghaffarabad (also Romanized as Ghaffārābād) is a village in Dibaj Rural District, Lotfabad District, Dargaz County, Razavi Khorasan Province, Iran. At the 2006 census, its population was 182, in 49 families.

References 

Populated places in Dargaz County